The Symphonia: sum fluxae pretium spei is an orchestral triptych by the American composer Elliott Carter.  Its three movements were composed between 1993 and 1995.  The complete work was first performed on April 25, 1998 at Bridgewater Hall, Manchester by the BBC Symphony Orchestra under the conductor Oliver Knussen.  The second movement "Adagio tenebroso" was a finalist for the 1996 Pulitzer Prize for Music.

Composition
The Symphonia: sum fluxae pretium spei has a total duration of roughly 47 minutes, though its movements can be performed separately.  The title comes from the Latin poem "Bulla" by the English poet Richard Crashaw and translates into English as "I am the prize of flowing hope."

Partita
The first movement "Partita" was commissioned by the Chicago Symphony Orchestra, which premiered the work under the conductor Daniel Barenboim at Symphony Center, Chicago on February 17, 1994.  "Partita" has a duration of approximately 17 minutes.  The title refers to the modern Italian language word for "game" rather than the Baroque dance suite.

Adagio tenebroso
The second movement "Adagio tenebroso" was commissioned by the BBC to celebrate the 100th anniversary of The Proms.  It was composed in 1994 and was first performed at the Royal Albert Hall, London on September 13, 1995, by the BBC Symphony Orchestra under the conductor Andrew Davis.  The piece is dedicated to the Proms and to Amira and Alexander Goehr.  "Adagio tenebroso" has a duration of approximately 20 minutes.

Allegro scorrevole
The third movement "Allegro scorrevole" was commissioned by the Cleveland Orchestra.  It was composed over the summer of 1995 and was first performed at Severance Hall, Cleveland on May 22, 1997, by the Cleveland Orchestra under the conductor Christoph von Dohnányi.  The piece is dedicated to the orchestra and Oliver Knussen.  "Allegro scorrevole" has a duration of approximately 11 minutes.

Instrumentation
The Symphonia is scored for a large orchestra comprising three flutes (2nd and 3rd doubling piccolo), two oboes, cor anglais, two clarinets (2nd doubling E-flat clarinet), bass clarinet, two bassoons, contrabassoon, four horns, three trumpets, three trombones, tuba, timpani, four percussionists, harp, piano, and strings.

Reception
The composition has been praised by critics and musicians alike.  Reviewing the world premiere of "Partita," John von Rhein of the Chicago Tribune highly praised the first movement, writing:
The complete Symphonia has been similarly lauded by critics and has been regarded as one of Carter's best works.  The cellist Fred Sherry (who performed the first recording of Carter's Cello Concerto) described the Symphonia: sum fluxae pretium spei as one of three Carter pieces he would "recommend to every music lover," including his Concerto for Orchestra and A Symphony of Three Orchestras.  The music critic Paul Griffiths, who wrote the libretto for Carter's opera What Next?, declared the piece "a symphony beyond symphonies".  Tom Service of The Guardian included the Symphonia among his list of the fifty greatest symphonies, writing:

References

Compositions by Elliott Carter
1993 compositions
1994 compositions
1995 compositions
20th-century symphonies
Music with dedications
Music commissioned by the BBC
Music commissioned by the Chicago Symphony Orchestra
Music commissioned by the Cleveland Orchestra